HMS Speedy was one of 21 s built for the Royal Navy in the 1930s.

Design and description
The Halcyon class designed as a replacement for the preceding Hunt class and varied in size and propulsion. The ship's complement consisted of 80 officers and ratings.

She was powered by two Parsons geared steam turbines, each driving one shaft, using steam provided by two Admiralty three-drum boilers.

Speedy was armed with two QF 4-inch (10.2 cm) anti-aircraft guns. She was also equipped with eight  machine guns. Later in her career, the rear 4-inch gun mount was removed as were most of the .303 machine guns, one quadruple mount for Vickers .50 machine guns was added as were up to four single or twin mounts for 20 mm Oerlikon AA guns. For escort work, her minesweeping gear could be exchanged for around 40 depth charges.

Construction and career
Speedy was built by William Hamilton & Co. at Port Glasgow, Scotland and completed at J. S. White & Co. at Cowes, Isle of Wight. She was commissioned in 1939. Her pennant number was N 17, later J 17. HMS Speedy saw service in the Mediterranean Sea based at Malta as part of 14th/17th Minesweeper Flotilla. In May 1943 she hit a mine, which resulted in the deaths of four crewmen, with eight injured. The ship was badly damaged but remained afloat and was towed to harbour for repairs. The ship was sold into mercantile service in 1946 and renamed Speedon. She was scrapped at Aden in 1957.

References

Bibliography

External links
 HMS Speedy (J 17)
 Minesweeping at Malta
 Halcyon-class.co.uk HMS Speedy

 

Halcyon-class minesweepers
Ships built on the River Clyde
1938 ships
World War II minesweepers of the United Kingdom